Aji Santoso (born 6 April 1970 in Malang, East Java, Indonesia) is an Indonesian former professional footballer and currently the head coach of Persebaya. He was a left-back during his playing days, and was a regular for the Indonesia national football team and Persebaya Surabaya. He was also the caretaker manager of the Indonesia national football team in 2012, after the sacking of Wim Rijsbergen.

International goals

Honours

Player
Arema Malang
 Galatama: 1992–93
 Liga Indonesia First Division: 2004

Persebaya Surabaya
 Liga Indonesia Premier Division: 1996–97

PSM Makassar
 Liga Indonesia Premier Division: 1999–2000

Indonesia
 Southeast Asian Games  Gold medal: 1991

Manager
Persebaya Surabaya
 Liga Primer Indonesia: 2011
 Liga 1 Runner Up: 2019
 East Java Governor Cup: 2020

Arema
 Indonesia President's Cup: 2017

Individual
 Liga 1 Coach of the Month: October 2021, December 2021
 Liga 1 Best Coach: 2021–22

References

External links 
 Santoso Profile

Indonesian footballers
1970 births
Living people
Sportspeople from Malang
Arema F.C. players
Persebaya Surabaya players
PSM Makassar players
Persema Malang players
Association football defenders
Indonesia international footballers
Indonesia national football team managers
Persebaya Surabaya managers
Indonesia Super League managers
Southeast Asian Games gold medalists for Indonesia
Southeast Asian Games medalists in football
Competitors at the 1991 Southeast Asian Games
Indonesian football managers
2000 AFC Asian Cup players
arema FC managers
PSIM Yogyakarta managers